Jeff or Geoff Atkinson may refer to:
 Canadian politician, see New Democratic Party candidates, 2003 Ontario provincial election
 Jeff Atkinson (athlete) (born 1963), American middle-distance runner
 Geoff Atkinson, British comedy writer
 Geoffrey Atkinson (1896–1951), English cricketer